Jean Michel was a French fencer. He competed in the men's masters épée event at the 1900 Summer Olympics.

References

External links
 

Year of birth missing
Year of death missing
French male épée fencers
Olympic fencers of France
Fencers at the 1900 Summer Olympics
Place of birth missing
Place of death missing